Soft rock is a music genre derived from popular and rock music.

Soft Rock may refer to:

 Soft Rock (album), by Lifter Puller, 2002
 "Soft Rock", a 2021 song by Cxloe

Other uses
 "Soft/Rock", a 2001 song by Lemon Jelly
 Underground soft-rock mining, a group of underground mining techniques used to extract minerals

See also
 Hard Rock (disambiguation)